Hypleurochilus bananensis is a species of combtooth blenny which is patchily distributed in the eastern central Atlantic ocean from Israel to the Democratic Republic of the Congo.  This species grows to a length of  SL.

References

bananensis
Fish of the Mediterranean Sea
Marine fauna of West Africa
Fish described in 1959
Taxa named by Max Poll